Michael Barry Reid (born May 24, 1947) is an American country music artist, composer, and former American football player.

Born and raised in Altoona, Pennsylvania, United States, Reid attended college at and graduated from the Pennsylvania State University, where he played defensive lineman for the Penn State Nittany Lions football team. He then spent five seasons with the Cincinnati Bengals in the National Football League, earning trips to the Pro Bowl after the 1972 and 1973 seasons, before retiring after the 1974 season. He subsequently focused on his musical career, co-writing several hit singles for country music artists, including Ronnie Milsap's "Stranger in My House", which won a Grammy Award for Best Country Song in 1984. Reid later began a solo recording career, releasing two studio albums for Columbia Records. He charted seven singles on the Billboard Hot Country Singles & Tracks (now Hot Country Songs) chart as a singer, including the number one hit "Walk on Faith".

Football career
At college, Reid was a captain on both the Nittany Lions undefeated 1968 and 1969 teams that went 22-0.
In his senior year (1969), the tackle spearheaded Penn State on defense with 89 tackles and was a unanimous All-America choice and All-East selection. He won the Outland Trophy as the best College football interior lineman in 1969, and also was awarded the 1969 Maxwell Award and finished fifth in the Heisman Trophy balloting. Reid also wrestled at Penn State and in 1967 he won the Eastern heavyweight wrestling title. In addition to athletics, Reid played Chicago gangster Big Julie in Penn State's production of the musical Guys and Dolls.

Reid was the first-round selection (#7 pick overall) of the Cincinnati Bengals in the 1970 NFL Draft. In the team's third season, it won the AFC Central Division and made the playoffs. In 1971, Reid established himself as one of the NFL's best pass rushers by recording 12 sacks, a figure he repeated in 1972. In 1971 Reid was a consensus All-AFC selection and the following year he was consensus All-Pro as well as being voted consensus All-AFC again.

In 1973, he topped those marks by recording 13 sacks. He was named All-Pro by the Newspaper Enterprise Association (NEA) and was second-team All-Pro according to the Associated Press and Pro Football Writers Association. For the third consecutive season Reid was consensus All-AFC.

In 1974, due primarily to injuries, he recorded only seven sacks, bringing his career total to 49. In his final season, Reid was again an All-AFC selection by Pro Football Weekly. Although sacks were an unofficial statistic, the Bengals kept track of them and Reid retired as the leading sacker in the team's short history.

He made two trips to the Pro Bowl (1972 and 1973) before his retirement following the 1974 season due to knee and hand injuries and his desire to focus on a music career. In 1996, he received the NFL Alumni Career Achievement Award for his success in his post-NFL career.

He was elected to the College Football Hall of Fame in 1987 and received the Walter Camp "Alumnus of the Year" award in 1987. In 1995, he received the NCAA Silver Anniversary Award. Reid was named as part of the Bengals' 40th Anniversary All-Time team in 2007. In 2017, Reid was named as part of the Bengals' 50th Anniversary All-Time Team.

Music career
After receiving his BA in music from Pennsylvania State University in 1969, Reid would perform as a pianist for the Utah Symphony Orchestra, Dallas Symphony Orchestra, and Cincinnati Symphony Orchestra.

When he abandoned his football career, he formed a band and began playing at a Holiday Inn location across the Ohio River from Cincinnati, then abandoned the idea of performing in bands and began playing solo at the Blind Lemon, and in the process, beginning to write his own songs. Living in Mount Lookout, he drove Eastern Avenue daily, and slowly "Eastern Avenue River Railway Blues" grew out of that. After a gig in Atlanta, Reid and some other musicians attended Southeastern Music Hall about 3:30 a.m. A cassette tape of that session somehow found its way to Jerry Jeff Walker, who, in 1978, became the first artist to record a Reid song, that being "Eastern Avenue River Railway Blues".

In 1980, Reid moved to Nashville, and quickly became known as an in-demand songwriter for Ronnie Milsap. Larry Gatlin also helped Reid spearhead his songwriting career.

In 1984, Reid won a Grammy Award for Best Country Song with "Stranger in My House", which was recorded by Ronnie Milsap. Reid would also contribute compositions to artists such as Marie Osmond, Tanya Tucker, Collin Raye, Alabama, and Conway Twitty. In the 1980s and 1990s, Reid wrote 12 No. 1 singles including "Forever's as Far as I'll Go", which was recorded in 1990 by Alabama; their 29th number one country hit. He was also featured as a guest vocalist on Milsap's "Old Folks", a No. 2 hit from early 1988.  He also co-wrote, with Allen Shamblin, Bonnie Raitt's hit "I Can't Make You Love Me", which reached #18 on the Billboard Pop Charts and has been covered by countless artists.

In 1990, Reid signed to Columbia Records as a recording artist. His debut album Turning for Home produced a No. 1 country hit in its lead-off single "Walk on Faith", although the album's other singles were not as successful. His second album, 1992's Twilight Town, produced two singles which both missed the Top 40.

A third album, New Direction Home, was released two decades later in 2012 by the small Off Row Records label and is available on iTunes and Spotify as well as in an mp3 download from Reid's website.

By 1991, Reid composed the music for the Civil War musical A House Divided. Over the following two decades, he wrote more musicals, including Quilts, Different Fields, Eye of the Blackbird, Tales of Appalachia, In This House, and The Ballad of Little Jo, a 1997 winner of the Academy of Arts and Letters' 'Richard Rodgers Award for Musical Theater'.

In 2019, he again returned to the musical theater stage with The Last Day, a commissioned production co-written with NYU Tisch School of Performing Arts Assistant Dean, Sarah Schlesinger, for Reid's alma mater, Penn State.

Reid was inducted into the Nashville Songwriters Hall of Fame in 2005.

Discography

Studio albums

Singles

Songwriting
For the most notable recordings of songs written by Mike Reid, see :Category:Songs written by Mike Reid (singer).

Music videos

References

External links
 

1947 births
Living people
20th-century American singers
21st-century American singers
All-American college football players
American Conference Pro Bowl players
American country singer-songwriters
American football defensive tackles
American male composers
American musical theatre composers
Cincinnati Bengals players
College Football Hall of Fame inductees
Columbia Records artists
Country musicians from Pennsylvania
Grammy Award winners
Male musical theatre composers
Maxwell Award winners
Penn State Nittany Lions football players
Players of American football from Pennsylvania
Singer-songwriters from Pennsylvania
Sportspeople from Altoona, Pennsylvania
American male singer-songwriters